The 2003 season of the Bhutanese A-Division was the ninth recorded season of top-flight football in Bhutan. 10 teams competed, and the championship was won by Druk Pol, their second title in a row and seventh in the last eight seasons. It is assumed that Veterans were promoted having won the final of the B-Division.

League standings

References

Bhutan A-Division seasons
Bhutan
Bhutan
1